Integrated schools are part of integrated education, an attempt to bring together children from both sides of the primary religious divide in Northern Ireland. They can be existing schools that have converted but remained controlled, or new schools that have proved themselves and are supported by being grant maintained.

Secondary schools
 Blackwater Integrated College, Downpatrick, (grant maintained), 2008
 Brownlow Integrated College, Craigavon, 1991 (Controlled)
 Crumlin Integrated College, Crumlin (Controlled) 2006
 Drumragh Integrated College, Omagh, (grant maintained), 1995
 Erne Integrated College, Enniskillen,(grant maintained), 1994
 Fort Hill Integrated College, Lisburn, 1998 (Controlled)
 Glengormley Intergrated College, Glengormley, 2022 
 Hazelwood Integrated College, Belfast,(grant maintained), 1985
 Integrated College Dungannon, Dungannon,(grant maintained), 1995
 Lagan College, Belfast, (grant maintained), 1981
 Malone College, Belfast, (grant maintained), 1997
 New-Bridge Integrated College, Loughbrickland, (grant maintained), 1995
 North Coast Integrated College, Coleraine, (grant maintained), 1996
 Oakgrove Integrated College, Derry, (grant maintained), 1992
 Parkhall Integrated College, Antrim  (Controlled) 2009
 Priory Integrated College, Holywood, 1998  (Controlled)
 Shimna Integrated College, Newcastle, (grant maintained), 1995
 Slemish College, Ballymena, (grant maintained), 1996
 Sperrin Integrated College, Magherafelt, (grant maintained), 2002
 Strangford Integrated College, Carrowdore, (grant maintained), 1997
 Ulidia Integrated College, Carrickfergus, (grant maintained), 1997

Closed
 Armagh Integrated College, Armagh, 2004-2009 (falling roll)
 Down Academy, Downpatrick 1998-2008 (Merged into Blackwater Integrated College)

Proposed
 Mid Down Integrated College, County Down, 2023

Primary schools

 Acorn Integrated Primary, Carrickfergus, (grant maintained), 1992
 All Children's Controlled Integrated Primary, Newcastle, 1986
 Annsborough Controlled Integrated Primary School, Castlewellan, 1997
  Ballycastle Integrated Primary School, Ballycastle
 Ballymoney Model Controlled integrated primary school, Ballymoney 
 Bangor Central Controlled Integrated Primary, Bangor, 1998
 Braidside Integrated Primary & Nursery School, Ballymena, (grant maintained), 1989
 Bridge Integrated Primary, Banbridge,(grant maintained), 1987
 Carhill Controlled Integrated Primary, Garvagh, 1991
 Carnlough Controlled Integrated Primary, Carnlough, 2001
 Cedar Integrated Primary, Crossgar,(grant maintained), 1995
 Corran Integrated Primary, Larne,(grant maintained), 1991
 Cliftonville primary School, Belfast 
 Cranmore Integrated Primary School, Belfast,(grant maintained), 1993
 Crumlin Controlled Integrated Primary School, Crumlin
 Drumlins Integrated Primary School, Ballynahinch, (grant maintained), 2004
 Enniskillen Integrated Primary, Enniskillen,(grant maintained), 1994
 Forge Integrated Primary School, Belfast, 1985
 Fort Hill Integrated Primary School, Lisburn
 Glencraig Controlled Integrated Primary School, Holywood
 Glengormley Controlled Integrated Primary, Glengormley, Newtownabbey 2003
 Groarty Controlled Integrated Primary School, Derry
 Hazelwood Integrated Primary, Belfast,(grant maintained), 1985
 Kilbroney Integrated Primary, Rostrevor, 1998
 Killyleagh Integrated Primary School, Killyleagh 2016
 Kircubbin Integrated Primary, Kircubbin, 1998
 Loughries Integrated Primary School Newtownards 2016
 Loughview Integrated Primary, Belfast,(grant maintained), 1993
 Mallusk Integrated Primary School, Mallusk
 Maine Integrated Primary School, Randalstown,(grant maintained), 2003
 Mill Strand Integrated Primary & Nursery School, Portrush,(grant maintained), 1987
 Millennium Integrated Primary, Saintfield,(grant maintained), 2000
 Oakgrove Integrated Primary, Derry,(grant maintained), 1991
 Oakwood Integrated Primary, Belfast,(grant maintained), 1996
 Omagh Integrated Primary, Omagh,(grant maintained), 1990
 Phoenix Integrated Primary, Cookstown,(grant maintained), 2004
 Portadown Integrated Primary, Portadown,(grant maintained), 1990
 Portaferry Integrated Primary, Portaferry, 1995
 Rathenraw Integrated Primary School, Antrim
 Roe Valley Integrated Primary, Limavady,(grant maintained), 2004
 Round Tower Controlled Integrated Primary, Antrim, 2003
 Rowandale Integrated Primary School, Moira,(grant maintained), 2007
 Saint and Scholars Integrated Primary, Armagh, (grant maintained), 1993
 Spires Integrated Primary, Magherafelt, (grant maintained), 1999
 Windmill Integrated Primary, Dungannon, (grant maintained), 1988

References

External links
 The Report of the Independent Review of Integrated Education
 The Northern Ireland Council for Integrated Education
 The Ireland Funds for Integrated Education
 The Integrated Education Fund (IEF)

 
Integrated schools